Aidu is a village in Lüganuse Parish, Ida-Viru County in northeastern Estonia. According to the 2011 census, there were no permanent residents living in the village.

References

Villages in Ida-Viru County
Lüganuse Parish